Rustam Khojayev (born 2 January 1973) is a retired Tajikistani footballer and current manager.

Career
On 21 August 2018, Khojayev was appointed as manager of FC Panjshir.

On 5 January 2019, Khojayev was appointed as the new manager of CSKA Pamir Dushanbe. On 23 June 2019, Khojayev resigned as manager of CSKA Pamir Dushanbe.

Career statistics

International

Statistics accurate as of 22 October 2015

International goals

Honours
Varzob Dushanbe
Tajik League (2): 1998, 1999
Tajik Cup (1): 1998, 1999
Regar-TadAZ
Tajik League (1): 2006
Tajik Cup (2): 2005, 2006
AFC President's Cup (1): 2005
Vakhsh Qurghonteppa
Tajik League (1): 2009
Tajikistan
AFC Challenge Cup (1): 2006

References

External links

1973 births
Living people
Tajikistani footballers
Tajikistan international footballers
Expatriate footballers in Kazakhstan
Tajikistani expatriate sportspeople in Kazakhstan
Expatriate footballers in Belarus
FC Shakhtyor Soligorsk players
Vakhsh Qurghonteppa players

Association football midfielders